...The Crimson Trial is the debut studio album of Collide, released in 1995 by Noiseplus Music. It was pressed in limited quantity cassette tape and all track versions are different than those on later releases. Songs on side two of the album remain unreleased elsewhere.

Reception
Sonic Boom praised the vocal performances of ...The Crimson Trial and said that vocalist Karin Johnston "creates a distinctive mood with seems to mesh with whatever particular style of music being played whither it is hardcore industrial dance to ambient percussion."

Track listing

Personnel
Adapted from ...The Crimson Trial liner notes.

Collide
 Eric Anest (as Statik) – programming, noises
 Karin Johnston (as Tripp9) – vocals

Production and design
 Durmel DeLeon – photography
 Noiseplus Productions – cover art, illustrations, design

Release history

References

External links 
  ...The Crimson Trial at collide.net
 

1995 debut albums
Collide (band) albums